= Velika Bukovica, Travnik =

Velika Bukovica
- Village
- Location within Bosnia and Herzegovina
- Coordinates: 44.2402182°N 17.6798838°E
- Country: Bosnia and Herzegovina
- Entity: Federation of Bosnia and Herzegovina
- Canton: Central Bosnia
- Municipality: Travnik

Area
  - Total: 8.29 sq mi (21.46 km^{2})

Population (2013)
  - Total: 99
  - Density: 12/sq mi (4.6/km^{2})
- Time zone: UTC+1 (CET)
  - Summer (DST): UTC+2 (CEST)

Velika Bukovica is a village in the municipality of Travnik, Bosnia and Herzegovina.

== Demographics ==
According to the 2013 census, its population was 99.

Ethnicity in 2013
Ethnicity	Number	Percentage
Bosniaks	71	71.7%
Croats	28	28.3%
Total	99	100%
